USS Inca was a small  yacht acquired by the United States Navy during the Spanish–American War. She was outfitted with an 11-pounder gun and, for a short while, patrolled Boston Harbor, before being turned over to the Massachusetts militia as a training ship, a role she retained until 1908.

Service history
Inca—a screw steamer—was built in 1898 by George Lawley & Son, South Boston, Massachusetts, and was acquired by the Navy from F. B. McQuesten of Boston, Massachusetts, on 13 June 1898. She commissioned on 15 June. Inca was assigned to Boston harbor during the Spanish–American War, serving as a patrol and training vessel. She decommissioned on 27 August 1898, and was turned over to the Massachusetts Militia, which she served as a training ship until 1908.

References

External links
 USS Inca (1898–1908)

Steamships of the United States Navy
Patrol vessels of the United States
Training ships of the United States Navy
Ships built in Boston
1898 ships
Spanish–American War naval ships of the United States